A dike swarm (American spelling) or dyke swarm (British spelling) is a large geological structure consisting of a major group of parallel, linear, or radially oriented magmatic dikes intruded within continental crust or central volcanoes in rift zones. Examples exist in Iceland and near other large volcanoes, (stratovolcanoes, calderas, shield volcanoes and other fissure systems) around the world. They consist of several to hundreds of dikes emplaced more or less contemporaneously during a single intrusive event, are magmatic and stratigraphic, and may form a large igneous province.

The occurrence of mafic dike swarms in Archean and Paleoproterozoic terrains is often cited as evidence for mantle plume activity associated with abnormally high mantle potential temperatures.

About 25 giant dike swarms are known on Earth. The primary geometry of most giant dike swarms is poorly known due to their old age and subsequent tectonic activity.

Dike swarms have also been found on Venus and Mars.

Examples

Africa
 Cape Peninsula dyke swarm (South Africa)
 Okavango Dyke Swarm (Botswana)
 Dolerite dikes in Guéra Massif (Chad, Central Africa)

Antarctica
 Vestfold Hills dike swarms (East Antarctica)

Asia
North China dike swarm (North China craton, China)
Sayan dike swarm (Russia)  
Shirotori-Hiketa dike swarm (northeastern Shikoku, Japan)

Australia
 Gairdner dyke swarm (South Australia)
 Mundine Well dyke swarm (Western Australia)
 Wood's Point dyke swarm (Victoria, Australia)

Europe
Egersund dike swarm (southwest Norway)
Kattsund-Koster dyke swarm (southeast Norway, Swedish west coast)
Kildonan dyke swarm (Isle of Arran, Scotland)
Kirov dike swarm (Russia) 
Scourie dyke swarm (northwest Scotland)
Orano dike swarm (Elba, Italy)
Satakunta dike swarms, Finland 
Sayda-Bergiesshuebel dike swarm (Saxony, Germany)
Uralian dike swarm, Russia
Barents Sea dike swarm

North America

Canada
Bella Bella and Gale Passage dike swarms (central British Columbia Coast)
Franklin dike swarm (Northern Canada)
Grenville dike swarm (Ontario and Quebec)
Mackenzie dike swarm (Northwest Territories, Nunavut, Saskatchewan, Manitoba and Ontario)
Marathon dike swarm (northwestern Ontario)
Matachewan dike swarm (eastern Ontario)
Mistassini dike swarm (western Quebec)
Sudbury dike swarm (northeastern Ontario)

Greenland
Kangaamiut dike swarm (western Greenland)

United States
 Chief Joseph dike swarm (southeastern Washington, northeastern Oregon)
 Kennedy dike swarm (southeastern Wyoming)
 Magdalena radial dike swarm (central New Mexico)
 San Rafael Swell dike swarm (Utah)
 Spanish Peaks Dike Swarm, southern Colorado
 Warm Springs Mountain dike swarm (Nevada)

South America
Dyke swarms associated with the Paraná and Etendeka traps
Cuaró dyke swarm, Uruguay
Eastern Paraguay dyke swarm
Ocros dyke swarm, Peru 
Uruguayan dyke swarms
Florida dyke swarm
Nico Perez dyke swarm
Treinta y Tres dyke swarm
Dyke swarms of Tandil and Azul (Buenos Aires Province, Argentina)
Rio Ceará-Mirim dyke swarm

See also
Sheet intrusion
Sheeted dyke complex
Sill swarm

References

 
Volcanism
Magmatic systems